Tiu, also known as Teyew, was an ancient Egyptian Pharaoh who ruled in the Nile Delta.

Tiu is mentioned in the Palermo Stone inscriptions, along with a small number of kings of Lower Egypt. As there is no other evidence of such a ruler, he may be a mythical king preserved through oral tradition, or may even be completely fictitious.

References

Pharaohs only mentioned in the Palermo Stone
People whose existence is disputed